Stevan Gordon McAleer (born 28 August 1984) is a British racing driver who competes for Team Korthoff Motorsports in the IMSA SportsCar Championship.

Career

Early Career
McAleer was introduced to motorsports at the age of 10, visiting a karting track in his hometown of Glasgow with friends. At age 11, he was gifted a go-kart by his father, before beginning to race karts competitively the following year. However, a move to car racing was postponed due to a lack of funding. After winning the Scottish Karting Championship four times, he moved to the United States in 2005 to pursue additional racing opportunities. While browsing Autosport, McAleer came across a scholarship which granted entry into the Skip Barber Regional Championship, paving the way for that move. In his opening season in the Eastern Regional Championship, McAleer finished second in points, tallying seven wins and 14 podiums. For 2007, he moved to the Skip Barber National Championship, tallying a fourth-place points finish in his first season. After adding a fifth-place finish in his second season, McAleer concluded his stint in the series with a part-time campaign in 2009. Money was tight while competing in the series, and he supplemented his racing income by working at both a supermarket and a karting facility in New York.

In 2009, after three years of competition in the Skip Barber national series, McAleer took part in a scholarship competition for a Formula BMW ride, becoming one of ten finalists who earned a test with Räikkönen Robertson Racing. In 2010, a driver coaching position with F2000 Championship Series driver Tim Paul led to a part-time schedule in the series. Through six races, McAleer claimed two podium finishes.

Mazda MX-5
While competing in regional junior formula championships, McAleer also competed in one-off sports car racing events. One of these events, the 25 Hours of Thunderhill, put him into contact with MLB pitcher C. J. Wilson, leading to a drive in the 2012 Global MX-5 Cup. McAleer scored a victory in the opening weekend at Sebring, adding two more victories and eight total podiums over the course of the season en route to the series championship. The championship prize gave him the opportunity to contest a full season in either the then-Continental Tire Sports Car Challenge or Pirelli World Challenge. Electing to pursue the former, McAleer teamed up with co-driver Marc Miller to take on the full season for C.J. Wilson Racing. Scoring class victories at COTA and Watkins Glen, the duo finished seventh in the Street Tuner class championship. McAleer also claimed the series' Rookie of the Year award. He returned to the team for the 2014 season, paired with new co-driver Chad McCumbee. They would claim three podiums but no race victories, finishing seventh in the Street Tuner class. For 2015, the driver lineup remained the same. At Watkins Glen in June, the duo claimed the team's first victory since 2013, before adding another victory at Lime Rock in July. Entering the final race of the season at Road Atlanta, McCumbee and McAleer sat just one point clear at the top of the class championship over Andrew Carbonell. Finishing eighth in class, the duo claimed the Street Tuner class championship.

Ahead of the 2016 season, the two drivers moved to Freedom Autosport. They scored their first victory for their new team at Laguna Seca, adding another at Lime Rock as they finished fourth in the class championship. The following season, McCumbee and McAleer claimed their third consecutive victory at Lime Rock, scoring another at Road America and finishing three consecutive seasons with two class victories. 

In 2022, McAleer served as a member of the judging panel for Mazda Motorsports' Spec MX-5 shootout competition.

Sports car racing

In 2018, McAleer embarked on a three-pronged program in the Continental Tire SportsCar Challenge, Pirelli World Challenge, and Lamborghini Super Trofeo North America. Joining Bodymotion Racing in the former series, McAleer moved to the GS class, competing in a Porsche Cayman GT4 Clubsport MR alongside Joe Robillard. Registering a best finish of sixth at Daytona, the team would compete in just six of the ten total races, finishing 28th in the GS-class championship. McAleer's campaign in the Pirelli World Challenge was also shortened, as he competed in just ten of the 18 races for the Classic BMW team, placing on the podium once; a second-place finish at COTA. His Lamborghini Super Trofeo exploits yielded a second-place finish in the Pro-Am championship, with McAleer representing the professional co-driver to amateur driver Randy Sellari.

For 2019, McAleer began competing in the IMSA Prototype Challenge, competing with the Mühlner Motorsport-backed Robillard Racing team. After lining up for the opening race alongside Kenton Koch, McAleer ran four of the final five races in a solo entry, driving alongside Robillard in the fourth event at Canadian Tire Motorsport Park. In his first race as a solo driver, at Sebring, McAleer claimed his first victory in the series. Later that season, at Mosport, he would claim his first pole in an IMSA-sanctioned series, going on to finish tenth during the race. After adding another race victory at VIR in August, McAleer came home second in the championship, 26 points behind Austin McCusker and Rodrigo Pflucker. McAleer also competed full-time in the GT4 America Series in 2019, driving for Classic BMW alongside Justin Raphael. Claiming two victories – at VIR and Road America – and seven total class podiums, the duo scored the East Pro-Am Cup title on a points technicality. Patrick Byrne and Guy Cosmo were listed as invisible for points as they entered their first race during the final two rounds of the season, moving McAleer and Raphael two points clear of Karl Wittmer in second.

2020 saw McAleer compete full-time in two IMSA-sanctioned series, returning to the IMSA Prototype Challenge alongside a Pro-class drive in the Lamborghini Super Trofeo North America. Driving alongside Stuart Middleton for Wayne Taylor Racing, the duo finished fourth in the overall championship, claiming six class podium finishes. Partnered once again with Robillard in the LMP3 ranks, McAleer claimed podium finishes at Sebring and VIR, finishing 10th in the championship. For 2021, McAleer took on a variety of drives in various series. The 2021 GT4 America Series saw McAleer return to Classic BMW, this time paired with Toby Grahovec. Despite not starting the first round at Sonoma, the duo finished fourth in the Silver Cup championship, scoring seven class podiums including a class victory at VIR and an overall victory at Watkins Glen, the latter of which came the day after the car was disqualified from the first race. Continuing in GT4 competition, McAleer embarked on a part-time campaign in the Michelin Pilot Challenge with RS1, driving alongside Patrick Gallagher. In his first race of the season, which took place at Watkins Glen, McAleer and Gallagher scored the overall race victory, adding a podium finish at Lime Rock later in the season. McAleer also completed a third full season in the IMSA Prototype Challenge, finishing fifth in the championship alongside Joe Robillard. McAleer and co-driver Madison Snow also took second in the Pro class of the Lamborghini Super Trofeo North America, claiming their only victory of the season at COTA in May.

McAleer returned to RS1 in 2022, taking part in both the GT4 America Series and Michelin Pilot Challenge with the team. McAleer's stint in the IMSA-sanctioned series was short, but through six races he claimed three podium finishes alongside various co-drivers, including Eric Filgueiras, Alexandre Prémat, and John Capestro-Dubets. After rallying to a late victory at the season-opening event at Daytona, McAleer added podium finishes at Laguna Seca and Watkins Glen, finishing 18th in the GS class championship despite missing four of the ten races. McAleer competed full-time for RS1 in the Silver Cup class of the GT4 America Series, driving alongside Eric Filgueiras. Out of the 14 races, the team would claim 11 class victories, finishing off of the podium just twice. Of the seven championship weekends, the duo swept four of them – at Sonoma, NOLA, Watkins Glen, and Indianapolis – clinching the title with one race to go.

McAleer competed full-time in the IMSA SportsCar Championship in 2022, driving for Team Korthoff Motorsports in the GTD class paired with Mike Skeen for the full season. Despite never claiming a race victory, the team remained in the title fight for the majority of the season, with McAleer eventually finishing third in the GTD standings with two podiums to his name. After being promoted to an FIA Gold Categorisation for 2023, McAleer departed the team.

Driver coaching
While competing full-time, McAleer also takes on driver coaching opportunities. While working at a karting facility in Mount Kisco, New York, he met Monticello Motor Club president Ari Straus, leading to McAleer working at the facility. According to McAleer, the coaching opportunities contribute to helping him become a better driver himself.

McCumbee McAleer Racing
In 2015, McAleer and then-teammate Chad McCumbee formed their own racing team, dubbed McCumbee McAleer Racing, to compete in the Mazda MX-5 Cup series. The team, based in Supply, North Carolina, entered three cars in their first season under title sponsorship from ModSpace. McCumbee McAleer Racing formed out of the ashes of C.J. Wilson's MX-5 Cup team – the same team that the two drivers were competing for in the Continental Tire Sports Car Challenge. In their opening season, they claimed two race victories and were named Team of the Year. Driver Patrick Gallagher, who competed for the team during 2017, scored the series championship for the team that season, claiming eight race victories and taking the title by over 100 points. The team was once again recognized as Team of the Year. In 2018, the team was awarded the Clean Image Award, owing to their professional appearance in the paddock.

In 2023, the team expanded to GT4 competition, fielding a Ford Mustang GT4 in the Michelin Pilot Challenge for McCumbee and former MX-5 Cup driver Jenson Altzman.

Personal life
The oldest of five brothers, McAleer was raised in the town of Rutherglen on the south-eastern outskirts of Glasgow, and attended Stonelaw High School. Early in his career, he would listen to Fleetwood Mac before races. He also owns his own go-karting team, and enjoys running outside of racing.

Racing record

Career summary

* Season still in progress.

Complete IMSA SportsCar Championship results
(key) (Races in bold indicate pole position)

References

External links
Stevan McAleer at Motorsport.com

1984 births
Living people
Scottish racing drivers
Sportspeople from Rutherglen
24 Hours of Daytona drivers
Michelin Pilot Challenge drivers
WeatherTech SportsCar Championship drivers
Wayne Taylor Racing drivers
JDC Motorsports drivers
Scottish expatriate sportspeople in the United States
People educated at Stonelaw High School